William Brydon  (10 October 1811 – 20 March 1873) was a British doctor who was assistant surgeon in the British East India Company Army during the First Anglo-Afghan War, famous for reportedly being the only member of an army of 4,500 men, plus 12,000 accompanying civilians, to reach safety in Jalalabad at the end of the long retreat from Kabul.

Early life
Brydon was born in London of Scottish descent.  He studied medicine at University College London and at the University of Edinburgh. He subsequently was appointed as a surgeon in the Bengal Army of the British East India Company.

Retreat from Kabul
In 1841 William Brydon was posted to Afghanistan as the assistant surgeon of Shah Shuja's Contingent—a British officered infantry force recruited in India to provide protection for the British-backed ruler in Kabul. This mercenary unit formed part of a combined British and Indian army which occupied the city in August 1839.

In January 1842, following the killing of the two British representatives there, it was decided to withdraw the British force in Kabul.

Under the command of Major-General William George Keith Elphinstone, 4,500 British and Indian soldiers plus 12,000 civilian camp followers, including wives and children, set out for Jalalabad on 6 January 1842, on the understanding that they had been offered safe passage. Afghan tribesmen intercepted them and proceeded to attack them during the next seven days.  Brydon recorded in his diary that as early as the first night of the retreat many of his sepoys were crippled by frostbite and had to be abandoned in the snow.

By the fourth day of the retreat Brydon's regiment had virtually ceased to exist though he himself was fortunate enough to have found some food abandoned by Lady Macnaghten—the wife of the British envoy murdered in Kabul.  The final stand took place at Gandamak on the morning of 13 January 1842, in the snow. Twenty officers and forty-five British soldiers, mostly of the 44th Foot, found themselves surrounded on a hillock. The Afghans attempted to persuade the soldiers that they intended them no harm. Then the sniping began, followed by a series of rushes. Captain Souter wrapped the regimental colours around his body and was dragged into captivity with a sergeant named Fair and seven privates. The remainder were shot or cut down.

Surgeon Brydon was one of twelve mounted officers who had become separated from the remnants of the main column before the final stand at Gandamak. This small group had ridden to Futtehabad, but half had been killed there while six escaped. All but Brydon were killed, one by one, further along the road as their horses became exhausted. Both Brydon and his pony were wounded in the course of encounters with small Afghan parties. On the afternoon of 13 January 1842, the British troops in Jalalabad, watching for their comrades of the Kabul garrison, saw a single figure ride up to the town walls. It was Brydon. Part of his skull had been sheared off by an Afghan sword, and he survived the blow because he had stuffed a copy of Blackwood's Magazine into his hat to fight the intense cold weather. The magazine took most of the blow, saving the doctor's life.

Brydon became widely, if inaccurately, known as being the only survivor of the entire army. In fact, he was not the only European to survive the retreat; about 115 British officers, soldiers, wives and children were captured or taken as hostages and survived to be subsequently released. Included, was the wife of Sir Robert Henry Sale, Lady Sale, though not Elphinstone, who died in captivity. Nor was Brydon the only European to survive the trek from Kabul to Jalalabad without spending time in captivity; by Brydon's own account a "Greek merchant", a Mr Baness, also made it to Jalalabad, arriving two days after Brydon but surviving for only one day. In addition a small number of Indian sepoys reached Jalalabad on foot over the subsequent weeks. One sepoy, havildar Sita Ram, escaped from Afghanistan after 21 months of slavery and rejoined his former regiment at Delhi. About 2,000 sepoys and an unrecorded number of camp followers were eventually found in Kabul and brought back to India by Pollock's "Army of Retribution" following their occupation of the city.

The episode was made the subject of a famous painting by the Victorian artist Lady Butler, who portrayed Brydon approaching the gates of the Jalalabad fort perched on his exhausted horse (which, according to Brydon, collapsed and died when put in a stable after arrival in the city). The painting is titled Remnants of an Army (see above).

Subsequent career and death
Upon recovering from his wound Brydon resumed his duties as a regimental surgeon with the "Army of Retribution" under General Pollock, which briefly reoccupied Kabul in September 1842. He narrowly escaped death from an enemy shell during this campaign.

Brydon fought in the Second Anglo-Burmese War of 1852, when Rangoon was taken.

At the time of the Sepoy Rebellion of 1857, Brydon was still serving as a surgeon of the Bengal Army. Stationed in Lucknow along with his wife and children, Brydon survived his second siege; that of the Lucknow residency (June – November 1857), in which he was badly wounded in the thigh. He was appointed a Companion of the Order of the Bath (CB) in November 1858. His wife, Colina Maxwell Brydon, published a memoir of the siege.

Brydon died at his home Westfield near Nigg in Ross-shire on 20 March 1873, and is buried in Rosemarkie churchyard alongside his brother-in-law Donald MacIntyre VC.

References

External links

 An article about William Brydon's report of the massacre
 
 Elizabeth Butler (Lady Butler) The Remnants of an Army 1879, Henry Tate Collection
 

British Indian Army officers
British East India Company Army officers
British surgeons
Companions of the Order of the Bath
1811 births
1873 deaths
British military personnel of the First Anglo-Afghan War
British military personnel of the Indian Rebellion of 1857
Alumni of University College London
Alumni of the University of Edinburgh
Sole survivors